Nabokov’s Butterflies is a book edited and annotated by Brian Boyd and Robert Michael Pyle that examines and presents Vladimir Nabokov’s passion for butterflies in his literary presentation.

The book contains a chapter by Boyd discussing the literary treatment of butterflies in VN’s work labeled "Nabokov, Literature, Lepidoptera", a chapter by Pyle to assess Nabokv’s standing as a lepidopterist ("Between Cloud and Climb") and writings of Nabokov concerning butterflies. The latter section includes previously unpublished writings by Nabokov, namely "Father’s Butterflies: Second Addendum to The Gift (translated by Dmitri Nabokov) and "The Butterflies of Europe", notes concerning an unfinished book about the lepidoptera of Europe. The book also contains an addendum compiled by Pyle that lists butterflies described by Nabokov and butterflies named after him.

Note
The above book is not to be confused with Nabokov’s Butterfly, a book by Rick Gekosi, a bibliophile, who recounts his experiences in the collection and sale of rare books.

References
 Nabokov’s Butterflies, edited by Brian Boyd and Robert Michael Pyle. Boston: Beacon Press, 2000. .

2000 non-fiction books
Books on Lepidoptera
Works about Vladimir Nabokov